Calais  is a city in Washington County, Maine, United States. As of the 2020 census, it had a population of 3,079, making Calais the third least-populous city in Maine (after Hallowell and Eastport). The city has three Canada–US border crossings (also known as ports of entry) over the St. Croix River connecting to St. Stephen, New Brunswick, Canada.

Calais has been a city of commerce and is recognized as the primary shopping center of eastern Washington County and of Charlotte County, New Brunswick. Retail, service, and construction businesses are the primary components of the Calais economy.

History

This area was occupied for thousands of years by indigenous peoples. The historic Passamaquoddy, an Algonquian-speaking people of the Wabanaki Confederacy, was predominant in this area at the time of European encounter and settlement.

The St. Croix River and its area were first explored by the French Samuel de Champlain when he and his men spent a winter on St. Croix Island in 1604. The first permanent settler was Daniel Hill of Jonesboro, who arrived in 1779 during the American Revolutionary War, when this was still part of Massachusetts. With other settlers, he built the first sawmill in 1782. On June 27, 1789, the Massachusetts General Court sold the township to Waterman Thomas for 19¢ an acre (approx. $2.86 an acre in 2018 dollars). Early occupations in the settlement included farming, hunting and ship building.

On June 16, 1809, Plantation Number 5 PS was incorporated as Calais after Calais, France, in honor of French assistance during the American Revolution. The river provided the mill town with water power for industry, which included sawmills, clapboard and shingle mills, two planing mills, a saw factory, two axe factories and four grain mills. There were foundries, machine shops, granite works, shoe factories and a tannery. Other businesses produced bricks, bedsteads, brooms, carriages and plaster.

The relationship between Calais and the neighboring Canadian town of St. Stephen has been remarkably close, over a period of many years.  As evidence of the longtime friendship between the towns, during the War of 1812, the British military provided St. Stephen with a large supply of gunpowder for protection against the enemy Americans in Calais, but St. Stephen's town elders gave the gunpowder to Calais for its Fourth of July celebrations.

Calais is the home of the first railroad built in the state of Maine, the Calais Railroad, incorporated by the state legislature on February 17, 1832. It was built to transport lumber from a mill on the St. Croix River opposite Milltown, New Brunswick,  to the tidewater at Calais in 1835. In 1849, the name was changed to the Calais & Baring Railroad, and the line was extended  farther to Baring. In 1870, it became part of the St. Croix & Penobscot Railroad.

Calais was incorporated as a city on August 24, 1850. On July 18, 1864, Confederate agents crossed the border from New Brunswick and attempted to rob a bank in Calais.

The Calais Free Library was designed by noted Boston architect Arthur H. Vinal and opened on July 4, 1893. The Romanesque Revival building was listed on the National Register of Historic Places in 2001.

Other places in Calais listed on the National Register of Historic Places are the Calais Historic District, Calais Residential Historic District, Devils Head Site, Gilmore House, Thomas Hamilton House, Hinckley Hill Historic District, Holmes Cottage, Dr. Job Holmes House, Theodore Jellison House, Pike's Mile Markers, St. Anne's Episcopal Church, George Washburn House and Whitlocks Mill Light.

Geography

Calais is located at  (45.166045, −67.242434).

Calais is located at the head of tide on the St. Croix River.

Recently, the City of Calais acquired Devil's Head. The site comprises  of land, one mile (1.6 km) of frontage on the St. Croix River estuary, and 6/10 of a mile of frontage on U.S. Route 1. Trail construction was completed in 2003.

Calais is the northern terminus of the East Coast Greenway, which has its southern terminus in Key West, Florida.

Demographics

2010 census
As of the census of 2010, there were 3,123 people, 1,403 households, and 771 families residing in the city. The racial makeup of the city was 95.5% White, 0.5% African American, 1.3% Native American, 0.6% Asian, 0.4% from other races, and 1.7% from two or more races. Hispanic or Latino of any race were 1.4% of the population.

There were 1,403 households, of which 25.3% had children under the age of 18 living with them, 38.8% were married couples living together, 11.2% had a female householder with no husband present, 4.9% had a male householder with no wife present, and 45.0% were non-families. 39.9% of all households were made up of individuals, and 20.3% had someone living alone who was 65 years of age or older. The average household size was 2.12 and the average family size was 2.80.

The median age in the city was 45.3 years. 19.7% of residents were under the age of 18; 9.9% were between the ages of 18 and 24; 20% were from 25 to 44; 29.9% were from 45 to 64; and 20.5% were 65 years of age or older. The gender makeup of the city was 48.3% male and 51.7% female.

Government
The City of Calais operates under the council-manager form of government.  The current city manager is James Porter. Some past city managers include: William Bridgeo, Nancy Orr, Nicholas Mull, Linda Pagels, Mark Ryckman, Diane Barnes and James Porter. The current city mayor is Billy Howard.

Education

Public schools
Calais has an elementary school, a middle school, a high school, and a technical school.
 Calais High School
 St. Croix Regional Technical School

Higher education
Calais is home to a two-year community college.  The nearest four-year university is located in Machias, Maine.
 Washington County Community College

Infrastructure

Transportation
Calais is located at the junction of U.S. 1, a major north-south highway that runs along the Eastern Seaboard, and Route 9, which crosses the state from east to west. Since October 25, 2012, the city also has had direct access to New Brunswick Route 1, a controlled-access freeway that begins at the Canada–US border and runs east through Saint John to a junction with the Trans-Canada Highway.  West's Bus Service operates a bus service between Calais and Bangor.

Healthcare
Calais Regional Hospital (CRH) currently has 15 acute care beds and 10 swing beds, in addition to a 24-hour physician staffed emergency department.  It serves northeastern Washington County with an approximate population of 14,000 from Topsfield to the north, Wesley to the west, and Eastport to the south.  CRH is the largest employer in Calais, employing more than 200 people.  The hospital is licensed by the State of Maine.
 Calais Regional Hospital

Public safety
Calais has a full-time police, fire, and EMS department.  In October 2022, a former Calais police officer was convicted of 14 counts of various crimes, including dealing drugs stolen from evidence lockers in the Calais Police department in exchange for what police described "euphemistically... in court documents as 'a non-monetary form of payment' in his cruiser while he still worked for Calais Police Department."

Notable people 

 Nehemiah Abbott, U.S. congressman
 Lyn Mikel Brown, academic, author
 Ron Corning, television anchorman
 Edwin Grant Dexter, educator
 Thomas Fuller, US congressman
 Andrea Gibson, spoken word artist, poet, activist
 Elijah Dix Green, merchant and founder of Calais' Second Baptist Church
 Roger Lyndon, mathematician
 Frederick A. Pike, US congressman
 James Shepherd Pike, journalist
 Henry Milner Rideout, author
 Tim Sample, humorist
 Harriet Prescott Spofford, author
 Ellen Smith Tupper, beekeeper, editor
 Amos Parker Wilder, journalist and diplomat
 Horatio Nelson Young, naval hero

International border crossings

The Ferry Point International Bridge and the Milltown International Bridge connect Calais to St. Stephen, New Brunswick, Canada. Construction began in 2008 on a third bridge and Port of entry (POE) to connect the two communities. Referred to as the International Avenue Bridge, this bridge and POE opened on November 16, 2009, and serves commercial, cargo, trucking, passenger vehicles, campers, RVs, and buses.  However, both the Ferry Point and Milltown crossings remain in use for passenger vehicles and pedestrians.

The new inspection facility alleviates traffic congestion from downtown Calais and the neighboring towns in Canada. It is equipped with state-of-the-art security equipment that allows for efficient processing of both commercial and passenger vehicles. The new facility is occupied by U.S. Customs and Border Protection (CBP), the U.S. Food and Drug Administration (FDA) and U.S. General Services Administration (GSA). This facility was built as part of GSA's high-performance green building program and has received the Leadership in Energy and Environmental Design (LEED) Gold certification for comprehensive use of sustainable design and technology. Recycled, reused, and local materials were used during the construction. The facility conserves energy by bringing natural light into every occupied space, and conserves water by using low-flow fixtures that consumes 40 percent less water than traditional plumbing. The Calais port of entry, designed by Robert Siegel Architects, provides six lanes of non-commercial inspection and three lanes of commercial inspection.

Sites of interest
St. Anne's Episcopal Church
Milltown Dam
Whitlocks Mill Light
Calais Observatory
Devils Head Site

References

External links

 City of Calais official website
 Calais Free Library
 The Calais Advertiser , Calais news
 Calais History and Photos

 
Cities in Maine
Cities in Washington County, Maine
Populated places established in 1779
1779 establishments in Massachusetts